Olga Preobrazhenskaya may refer to:

 Olga Preobrajenska (1871–1962), Russian ballerina
 Olga Preobrazhenskaya (director) (1881–1971), Russian and Soviet actress and film director